The Tapirapé River is a river of Pará state in Brazil. It is a tributary of the Itacaiúnas River.

See also
List of rivers of Pará

References

Brazilian Ministry of Transport

Rivers of Pará